Ernest Smith (1914–2005) was a Canadian soldier and recipient of the VC.

Ernest Smith may also refer to:

Ernest Smith (artist) (1907-1975), native American artist
Ernest Smith (baseball) (1908–?), Negro league baseball player
Ernest Smith (boxer) (1912–?), Irish Olympic boxer
Ernest Smith (cricketer, born 1869) (1869–1945), English cricketer
Ernest Smith (cricketer, born 1888) (1888–1972), English cricketer
Tiger Smith (Ernest James Smith, 1886–1979), English cricketer
Ernest A. Smith (1864–1952), Canadian politician
Bert Smith (footballer, born 1896) (Ernest Edwin Smith, 1896–?), footballer who played for Cardiff, Middlesbrough and Watford
E. D. Smith (Ernest D'Israeli Smith, 1853–1948), Canadian businessman and politician
Ernest O. Smith (18851935), American educator
Ernest J. Smith, Canadian architect
C. Ernest Smith (1894–1970), American lawyer, politician, and judge

See also
Ernie Smith (disambiguation)
Ernest Somers-Smith (1895–1950), English cricketer
Ernest Smythe (1904–1975), English cricketer and Indian Army officer